Rasik Krishna Mallick (1810 – 8 January 1858) was an Indian journalist, editor, reformer, educationist and a leading member of Young Bengal group. He had shocked the court in British India in the 1820s with the statement that he did not believe in the sacredness of the Ganges.

Early life
Son of Naba Kishore Mallick, he was born in 1810 at Sinduriapatti in Kolkata. His father was engaged in thread trading and was linked to the Seths, the original residents of Govindapur, which was one of the villages that developed into the city of Kolkata. The family had a great standing in society.

After initial education at home with some grounding in English, Rasik Krishna Mallick joined Hindu College and turned out to be a highly successful student, one of the flowers of the institution. He greatly admired the activities of Raja Rammohun Roy, who was then active in Kolkata and was greatly influenced by his thinking. In 1828, when Derozio joined Hindu College, he became one of his disciples.

While still a student, Rasik Krishna Mallick appeared as witness in some case in the supreme court at Kolkata. In those days, the system was that the Hindu witnesses had to take oath touching a copper vessel containing Ganges water and tulsi (holy basil) leaf. An Oriya Brahmin came with these things to every witness. When the process was repeated with Rasik Krishna Mallick, he refused to comply. When his Bengali statement was translated in court as, "I do not believe in the sacredness of the Ganges," there was a hush, every one put their hands to their ears and thought, "How can a boy from the Mallick family say this?" The Ganges has always been considered to be sacred by the Hindus.

The result was that his family drugged him and wanted to take him forcibly to Varanasi for penance and reformation. However, Rasik Krishna Mallick recovered and ran away. His family turned him out of the house. He worked in Hare School for some time. When Indians were allowed for the first time to be appointed or promoted as deputy collectors Rasik Krishna Mallick was one of the beneficiaries and was posted to Bardhaman. While he was in Bardhaman, his old friend Ramtanu Lahiri, then posted in the same town, created a sensation by discarding his sacred thread. He became religious-minded and carried out his duties fearlessly. He spurned all efforts to bribe him and established a great reputation for honesty.

Achievements
He was editor of the magazine Jnananwesan and was one of the sponsors of Parthenon,  the first English magazine to be edited and published by Indians in 1830. He was editor of Jnantarangasindhu. He was vocal on many issues of the day and enlightened public opinion on many matters.

He was actively involved in the social reforms launched by the organisation named Suhrid Samiti of Kishori Chand Mitra, brother of his friend Peary Chand Mitra. In 1831, he established a free Hindu school for the spread of education. He also tried for the spread of education though Calcutta Public Library of Rasamay Dutta. He was a strong advocate of the use of the mother tongue as the medium of education without ignoring the learning of English. He campaigned strongly for the replacement of Persian in courts by Bengali and was partly successful in the matter.

Citing specific examples of political thinking by Derozians, Nitish Sengupta writes, "In 1833 Rasik-Krishna Mallik criticised police corruption, attributed the lack of protection of the peasantry to the Permanent Settlement, and advocated the abolition of the political power of the merchant company.

Still in the prime of his life, he died of illness on 8 January 1858.

Notes

References
 Ramtanu Lahiri O Tatkalin Banga Samaj, in Bengali by Sivanath  Sastri, page 81.
 Sansad Bangali Charitabhidhan (Biographical dictionary) in Bengali edited by Subodh Chandra Sengupta and Anjali Bose, page 462.

See also

1810 births
1858 deaths
Presidency University, Kolkata alumni
Bengali Hindus
19th-century Bengalis
Writers from Kolkata
Young Bengal
Bengali writers
Journalists from West Bengal
Indian journalists
19th-century Indian journalists
Indian editors
Indian newspaper editors
Indian writers
Indian novelists
Indian male writers
Indian male novelists
19th-century Indian writers
19th-century Indian male writers
19th-century Indian novelists
Indian social reformers
Indian social workers
Educationists from India
Indian educational theorists
Indian educators
19th-century Indian educators
19th-century Indian educational theorists